or  is a lake in Fauske Municipality in Nordland county, Norway. The Lomi Hydroelectric Power Station uses the lake as a reservoir.

See also
 List of lakes in Norway
 Geography of Norway

References

Lakes of Nordland
Fauske